Events in the year 1899 in Bulgaria.

Incumbents

Events 

 25 April – The Liberal Party won 89 of the 169 seats in the parliament following parliamentary elections. Voter turnout was 49.5%.

References 

 
1890s in Bulgaria
Years of the 20th century in Bulgaria
Bulgaria
Bulgaria